Agardh is a surname. Notable people with the surname include:

 Carl Adolph Agardh (1785–1859), Swedish botanist and bishop
 Ingela Agardh (1948–2008), Swedish journalist and television presenter
 Jacob Georg Agardh (1813–1901), Swedish botanist, phycologist, and taxonomist, son of Carl

See also
 Agard